Nils Fernando Gottschick (born 9 October 1993) is a German footballer who plays as a midfielder for FSV 63 Luckenwalde.

Career
Gottschick made his professional debut for Energie Cottbus in the 3. Liga on 26 August 2014, coming on as a substitute in the 84th minute for Sven Michel in the 2–0 home win against Wehen Wiesbaden.

References

External links
 Profile at DFB.de
 Profile at kicker.de
 Nils Gottschick at FuPa

1993 births
Living people
Footballers from Berlin
German footballers
Association football midfielders
Hertha BSC II players
VfB Germania Halberstadt players
FC Energie Cottbus players
FC Energie Cottbus II players
Berliner AK 07 players
TSG Neustrelitz players
1. FC Lokomotive Leipzig players
3. Liga players
Regionalliga players